Thunder Cross II is a horizontally scrolling shoot 'em up arcade game released by Konami in 1991 and it is the direct sequel of Thunder Cross. It wouldn't see a release outside of Japan or on home consoles until eventually seeing a release as part of the Arcade Archives series on the Nintendo Switch and PlayStation 4 worldwide on April 28, 2021.

Reception 
In Japan, Game Machine listed Thunder Cross II on their September 1, 1991 issue as being the fifteenth most-successful table arcade unit of the month.

Staff
 Producer: T. Nakagawa 
 Programmers: K. Tokunaga, K. Kano 
 Graphic designers: Satoru. K, S. Yamamoto, T. Kiuchi, Y. Kimura, Y. Takano, Kazuaki Nakanishi, T. Nakanishi, T. Nakazawa, M. Tohyama 
 Assist: Y. Suzuki 
 Sound designer: Mikio Saito (Metal Yuhki)

References 

 Thunder Cross II at Arcade-History

1991 video games
Arcade video games
Arcade-only video games
Konami games
Horizontally scrolling shooters
Video game sequels
Konami arcade games
Video games developed in Japan